I Survived may refer to:

 I Survived..., a documentary television series produced by NHNZ that airs on Lifetime Movie Network and on Court TV
 I Survived (book series), children's historical fiction novels by American author Lauren Tarshis
 I Survived: Hindi Sumusuko Ang Pinoy (English: I Survived: Filipinos Don't Give Up), a reality drama program aired by ABS-CBN